UFO Radio (also known as UFO Network) is a radio station in Taiwan.

The station covers Chinese music and talk. It also plays international, country, rock, and folk music. UFO Radio was launched on 16 October 1996. It has the slogan "Air Dreamer" (空中的夢想家).

References

External links
 UFO Radio website 

1996 establishments in Taiwan
Radio stations established in 1996
Radio stations in Taiwan
Chinese-language radio stations